Hewitt Lake may refer to:

Places 
Hewitt Lake National Wildlife Refuge, a protected area in Montana
 Hewitt Lake (Arkansas), see List of lakes in Logan County, Arkansas
 Hewitt Lake (Montana), see List of lakes in Phillips County, Montana
Hewitt Lake (Washington), a lake in Washington

Other uses 
 Hewitt Lake (microarchitecture), a code name for a processor microarchitecture developed by Intel used by Xeon D SoC